John Marshall Kelly Jr. (born October 4, 1996) is an American football running back for the Cleveland Browns of the National Football League. He played college football at Tennessee.

Early years
Born in Joliet, Illinois, and then later moved to Detroit, Michigan at the age of 12, Kelly attended Oak Park High School in Oak Park, Michigan. He played on the football team for head coach Greg Carter. He was a three-year starter for the Knights and contributed on offense as a running back, on defense as a cornerback, and a returner on special teams. As a senior, he recorded 25 touchdowns on offense and 39 tackles on defense. He was named to the Associated Press Michigan All-State Team. Kelly received offers from Tennessee, Michigan, Michigan State, Iowa, Cincinnati, and Maryland among others. Kelly committed to the University of Tennessee to play college football under head coach Butch Jones.

College career
Kelly attended and played college football for the University of Tennessee from 2015-2017.

Freshman year
As a freshman in the 2015 season, Kelly was the third running back behind Jalen Hurd and Alvin Kamara. He saw occasional time in relief and late-game situations. He made his collegiate debut in the season opener against the Bowling Green Falcons. In the 59–30 victory, he had eight carries for 29 yards. After various appearances throughout the season,  he scored his first career touchdown, a one-yard rush in the fourth quarter, in the 2016 Outback Bowl in the 45–6 victory over the Northwestern Wildcats. He finished the season with 40 carries for 165 yards and a touchdown.

Sophomore year
As a sophomore in the 2016 season, Kelly started the season in a similar role to the previous year as Hurd and Kamara both returned. He made his season debut in the 2016 Pilot Flying J Battle at Bristol against Virginia Tech. In the 45–24 victory, he had one carry for four yards and a touchdown. Later on, an opportunity arose for Kelly, as Hurd had some team issues and did not play in the game against Texas A&M. In the game against Texas A&M, Kelly was the second running back behind Kamara. He had 13 carries for 89 yards and a touchdown in the 2OT loss. After a quiet game against Alabama, he had 14 carries for 94 yards in a loss against South Carolina. After the loss, Hurd quit the team and Kelly firmly took the role as the second running back. In the game against Tennessee Tech, he had seven carries for 104 yards and a touchdown. After some solid performances to close the regular season, he had 15 carries for 70 yards and a touchdown in the victory over Nebraska in the 2016 Music City Bowl. Overall, in his sophomore season, Kelly had 98 carries for 630 yards and five touchdowns.

Junior year
With Kamara entering the 2017 NFL Draft, Kelly returned as the main running back for the Volunteers for the 2017 season. Kelly started the season sharing the backfield with Ty Chandler and Carlin Fils-Aime. In the season opener against Georgia Tech at Mercedes-Benz Stadium, Kelly had a career day in Tennessee's 42–41 2OT victory. In the game, he had 19 carries for 128 yards and four rushing touchdowns and five receptions for 35 yards. In the 26–20 loss to Florida Gators, he had 19 carries for 141 yards and a rushing touchdown. In addition, he had six receptions for 96 yards in the game. On September 23, against Massachusetts, he had 25 carries for 101 yards and a touchdown.  On September 30, against Georgia, he had 44 rushing yards and 47 receiving yards in the 41–0 loss. On November 4, he recorded 20 carries for 79 yards and two touchdowns against Southern Miss. On November 18, against LSU, he had 25 carries for 47 yards, three receptions for 31 yards, and threw a 10-yard pass in the 30–10 loss. In his final collegiate game, a 42–24 loss to Vanderbilt, he had 10 carries for 20 yards and a rushing touchdown. Overall, he finished the 2017 season with 778 rushing yards, nine rushing touchdowns, 37 receptions, and 299 receiving yards. On December 29, 2017, Kelly declared his intentions to enter the 2018 NFL Draft.

Collegiate statistics

Professional career

Los Angeles Rams
Kelly was drafted by the Los Angeles Rams in the sixth round (176th overall) of the 2018 NFL Draft. He was selected by the Rams through a pick that was previously acquired from the New York Giants in exchange for Alec Ogletree. He signed a four-year contract on June 9, 2018. He joined a running backs unit that contained Todd Gurley and Malcolm Brown. During the game against the Detroit Lions in Week 13, Brown suffered a clavicle injury, giving Kelly the opportunity for playing time. He made his NFL debut on Special Teams against the Chicago Bears in Week 14, playing seven snaps. In the following game, against the Philadelphia Eagles, he recorded his first professional carries with two for four yards. With Gurley sitting out Week 16, Kelly recorded 10 carries for 40 yards and had a nine-yard reception against the Arizona Cardinals in Week 16. Gurley again was inactive for Week 17 against the San Francisco 49ers, giving Kelly the opportunity to have 15 carries for 30 rushing yards and a 18-yard reception. In the Divisional Round against the Dallas Cowboys, he had a special teams tackle in his playoff debut. He saw playing time on special teams in the NFC Championship and Super Bowl LIII. Overall, in his rookie year, he finished with 74 rushing yards.

Kelly was waived during final roster cuts on August 31, 2019, but was signed the next day to the Rams' practice squad. He was promoted to the active roster on October 12, 2019. He was waived on November 16, 2019, and re-signed to the practice squad. He was promoted back to the active roster on December 28, 2019. He was waived on September 4, 2020.

Cleveland Browns
Kelly was signed by the Cleveland Browns' to their practice squad on September 9, 2020. He was released on December 15, but re-signed to the practice squad the next day.

The Browns signed Kelly to a reserve/futures contract on January 19, 2021. Kelly was waived by the Browns on August 31. Kelly was re-signed to the Browns' practice squad on September 1. He was promoted to the active roster on October 19. He was waived on November 20 and re-signed to the practice squad.

The Browns signed Kelly to a reserve/futures contract on January 19, 2022. The Browns terminated Kelly's contract on August 30, 2022. The Browns signed Kelly to their practice squad on August 31, 2022. He signed a reserve/future contract on January 9, 2023.

References

External links
Collegiate statistics at Sports-Reference.com
 John Kelly on Twitter
Cleveland Browns bio
Tennessee Volunteers bio

1996 births
Living people
Sportspeople from Joliet, Illinois
Players of American football from Illinois
Players of American football from Detroit
American football running backs
Tennessee Volunteers football players
Los Angeles Rams players
Cleveland Browns players